Stephen Michael Lynch (born 18 February 1976) is a former New Zealand cricketer. Lynch played a total of 24 first-class games for Auckland between 1995/96 and 1999/2000. In 1993/94, Lynch captained the New Zealand under-19 team, drawing three under-19 Tests against Pakistan.

See also
List of Auckland representative cricketers

References

1976 births
Auckland cricketers
Living people
New Zealand cricketers
New Zealand Youth One Day International captains
New Zealand Youth Test captains